Shyam (Black) is a 2016 Indian Malayalam-language drama family film directed and produced by debutant Sebastian Maliyekkal, under the banner of Rajageetham Films Pvt. Ltd. The film features Rahul Madhav, Bhagath Manuel, Vivek Gopan and Aparna Bajpai in the lead roles. It was released on 26 August 2016.

Plot 
The film which revolves around friendship and love tells the story of Shyam (Rahul Madhav), who lost his father when he was young, and the developing unique relationship with his mother Rajamma (Sajitha Madathil) and mutual friends, who support him during difficult situations.

Shyam works as an accountant. He is liked and loved by others. Sebin (Bhagath Manuel) is a supervisor in a car company, Stephen (Govindankutty) works as a medical representative and Ramachandran (Vivek Gopan) is a sales executive. The incidents in the lives of these bachelors form the plot. The film portrays how one's childhood experiences influence the future and personality of others and the value of relations in one's life.

Cast 
 Rahul Madhav as Shyam
 Bhagath Manuel as Sebin
 Aparnaa Bajpai as Sinda 
 Vivek Gopan as Ramachandran
 Govindankutty as Stephen
 Sajitha Madathil as Rajamma (Shyam's mother)
 Shaju Sasi
 Nazeer Sankranthi
 Radhika
 Faizal
 Sharvin Benedict

Music 
Ouseppachan composed the soundtrack album for the film and Sebastian Maliyekkal wrote the lyrics.

References

External links 
 

2016 films
2010s Malayalam-language films
Indian drama films